XHVP-FM is a radio station on 101.3 FM in Atlixco, Puebla. It is owned by Cinco Radio and is known as Sol FM with a grupera format.

History
XHVP received its concession on July 7, 1981; the station was known as Stereo Sol for many years. It was owned by Felipe Casas Serrano until 2006.

The La Movidita format was born at XEPOP-AM in Puebla in 2004, primarily playing tropical hits. The name was recycled for XHVP in 2009 and remained in use in Atlixco until the station relaunched as "Sol FM" on March 17, 2018.

References

Radio stations in Puebla